Afraid to Dance is a 1988 Australian film directed by Denny Lawrence and starring Nique Needles and Rosey Jones. It was shot in 1988 and located at Sydney, New South Wales but was never released theatrically and went straight to video.

Cast
Nique Needles as The Male
Rosey Jones as The Female
Grigor Taylor as Jim Pratt
Tina Bursill as Driving Woman
Annie Byron as Betty
Mervyn Drake as Terry
Tom Richards as Don Chapman
Steve Spears as Garage Man
Allan Penney as Newsagent
Bill Young as Publican
Stuart Halcroft as Supermarket Attendant
Marina Finlay as Checkout Girl
Fred Welsh as Tom
Kate Parker as Large Woman
Angela Cockburn as Supermarket Mother
David Cockburn as Little Boy
Coby Cockburn as Little Girl
Lindsay McCormack as Greg

References

External links
Afraid to Dance at IMDb

Australian direct-to-video films
Films scored by Chris Neal (songwriter)
1980s English-language films
1980s Australian films